Gorazd Zajc (born 28 December 1987) is a retired Slovenian footballer who played as a forward.

References

External links
Player profile at NZS 

1987 births
Living people
Sportspeople from Maribor
Slovenian footballers
Association football forwards
Slovenian PrvaLiga players
NK Maribor players
Slovenian expatriate footballers
Slovenian expatriate sportspeople in Italy
Expatriate footballers in Italy
A.C.N. Siena 1904 players
NK Rudar Velenje players
NK Drava Ptuj players
NK Celje players
NK Aluminij players
Slovenian Second League players
Slovenia youth international footballers
Slovenia under-21 international footballers